Panshino is a rural locality (a khutor) and the administrative center of Panshinskoye Rural Settlement, Gorodishchensky District, Volgograd Oblast, Russia. The population was 1,054 as of 2010. There are 19 streets.

Geography 
Panshino is located in steppe, 60 km northwest of Gorodishche (the district's administrative centre) by road. Sady Pridonya is the nearest rural locality.

References 

Rural localities in Gorodishchensky District, Volgograd Oblast